Maria Nirmala Joshi (23 July 1934 – 23 June 2015) was an Indian Catholic Religious Sister who succeeded Nobel laureate Mother Teresa as the head of her Missionaries of Charity and expanded the movement overseas. After taking over the charity following Mother Teresa's death in 1997, Nirmala expanded the organisation's reach to 134 countries by opening centres in nations such as Afghanistan and Thailand.

Biography
Nirmala Joshi

Joshi, née Kusum, was born on 23 July 1934 in a Brahmin family as the eldest of the ten children at in Syanja, Nepal. Although the family was Hindu, she was educated by Christian missionaries in Mount Carmel, Hazaribagh, India. At that time, she learned of Mother Teresa's work and wanted to share in that service. She soon converted to Catholicism and joined the Missionaries of Charity, founded by Mother Teresa. Joshi completed a master's degree in political science and then went on to secure a doctorate degree in law from the University of Calcutta. She was one of the first Sisters of the institute to head a foreign mission when she went to Panama. In 1976, Joshi started the contemplative branch of the Missionaries of Charity and remained at its head until 1997, when she was elected to succeed Mother Teresa as Superior General of the institute.

The government of India bestowed the Padma Vibhushan, the second highest civilian award, on Sister Joshi on Republic Day (26 January) 2009 for her services to the nation. Her term as Superior General ended on 25 March 2009, and she was succeeded by German born Sister Mary Prema Pierick.

Death
Joshi died on 25 June 2015 in Kolkata from a heart ailment. Many leaders of India expressed their condolences in media, including Prime Minister Narendra Modi and West Bengal Chief Minister Mamata Banerjee.

References

External links
 Archived from the original source.
CWS interview with Mother Teresa's successor
Indian-born nun to succeed Mother Teresa
Sr. Nirmala: The Guiding Light

1934 births
People from Ranchi
Converts to Roman Catholicism from Hinduism
Indian people of Nepalese descent
20th-century Indian Roman Catholic nuns
Social workers
Indian anti-poverty advocates
Recipients of the Padma Vibhushan in social work
Superiors general
University of Calcutta alumni
2015 deaths
20th-century Indian educators
21st-century Indian Roman Catholic nuns
21st-century Indian educators
Women educators from West Bengal
Educators from West Bengal
People from Kolkata
Social workers from West Bengal
People from Syangja District
20th-century women educators
21st-century women educators